Plagiobothrys mollis is a species of flowering plant in the borage family known by the common name soft popcornflower. It is native to Oregon, Nevada, and the Sierra Nevada of California, where it grows in scrub and grassy habitat, especially in moist and wet areas.

Description
It is a perennial herb producing small, decumbent stems running along the ground and rooting at nodes. It is very hairy in texture, the hairs soft and long. The leaves on the stem may be arranged alternately or oppositely. The inflorescence is a series of tiny white flowers up to 1 centimeter wide.

Varieties
There are two varieties of this plant. Most incidences are var. mollis.
The other variety, var. vestitus, is known only from the type specimen collected in the 19th century near Petaluma, California. It has not been seen since, and is presumed extinct.

External links
Jepson Manual Treatment
Photo gallery

mollis
Flora of California
Flora of Oregon
Flora of Nevada
Flora without expected TNC conservation status